Adrit Roy (born 25 May 1992) is an Indian Bengali film and television actor and is well known for portraying the character of Siddharth Modak in Mithai.

Early life and education 
Roy was born in Kolkata. He went to La Martiniere Calcutta school, where he was active in theater and performance.

Career 
Roy made his film debut playing the eponymous role in Abhimanyu Mukherjee's 2018 film Noor Jahaan. In 2019, he starred in Prem Amar 2 as Joy. He also acted in Dev Entertainment Ventures' Password, directed by Kamaleshwar Mukherjee, as well as Raj Chakraborty Productions' Parineeta, directed by Raj Chakraborty.

Filmography

Television

Television Movies

Special Appearances

Awards

References

External links 
 

21st-century Indian male actors
Living people
1992 births
Male actors from Kolkata